ZII (or Zombie II) is the third EP by American metalcore band The Devil Wears Prada. The EP, a sequel to 2010's Zombie, was released on May 21, 2021, through Solid State Records and is the band's first release with bassist Mason Nagy.

Background and promotion
On March 31, 2021, the band released a teaser video titled "Upset the Sickness" via Solid State's YouTube channel. The EP was officially announced on April 7, along with the track listing and artwork. Lead vocalist Mike Hranica stated that while Zombie was "about how to fend off the apocalypse," ZII will be about "hopelessness against the horde." Additionally, ZII was inspired by the COVID-19 pandemic. 

"Termination" was released as the EP's lead single on April 23. "Nightfall" was released as the second single on May 14. A music video was released for "Forlorn" on May 21, the same day as the EP's release.

In the lead up to the release, the band hosted a livestream on May 15, 2021, which they called an "Undeadstream", where they performed the EP in full.

Track listing

Personnel

The Devil Wears Prada
Mike Hranica – lead vocals, production
Kyle Sipress – lead guitar, backing vocals, production
Jeremy DePoyster – rhythm guitar, clean vocals, production
Mason Nagy – bass
Jonathan Gering – keyboards, synthesizer, programming, backing vocals, production
Giuseppe Capolupo – drums

Production
Josh Barber – engineering, additional guitar tracking
Alex Prieto – mixing
Brendan Collins – mix assistant, digital editing
Kevin McCombs – additional engineering
Mike Kalajian – mastering
Anthony Barlich – photography
Micah and Luke Seedamk – layout and design

Charts

References

The Devil Wears Prada (band) albums
2021 EPs
Solid State Records EPs
Concept albums
Zombies and revenants in popular culture
Sequel albums